Brycinus is a genus of ray-finned fish in the family Alestiidae. Like other "African characids", they were formerly included in the Characidae but are actually somewhat more distantly related Characiformes.

Like some other Alestiidae, they are called robber tetras due to their bold and rather carnivorous habits. They are not infrequently kept as aquarium fishes and in their requirements resemble the South American tetras of the Characidae. Unlike these, Brycinus are not well-suited to accompany delicate fishes however and are better kept with dwarf cichlids and similar small but robust companions.

Species

There are currently 36 recognized species in this genus:
 Brycinus abeli (Fowler, 1936)
 Brycinus affinis (Günther, 1894) (Red-fin robber)
 Brycinus bartoni (Nichols & La Monte, 1953)
 Brycinus batesii (Boulenger, 1903)
 Brycinus bimaculatus (Boulenger, 1899)
 Brycinus brevis (Boulenger, 1903)
 Brycinus carmesinus (Nichols & Griscom, 1917)
 Brycinus carolinae (Paugy & Lévêque, 1981)
 Brycinus comptus (T. R. Roberts & D. J. Stewart, 1976)
 Brycinus derhami Géry & Mahnert, 1977
 Brycinus epuluensis Decru, Vreven, Sadio & Snoeks, 2016 
 Brycinus ferox (A. J. Hopson & J. Hopson, 1982) (Large-toothed Lake Turkana robber)
 Brycinus fwaensis Géry, 1995
 Brycinus grandisquamis (Boulenger, 1899) (Pink-fin robber)
 Brycinus humilis (Boulenger, 1905)
 Brycinus imberi (W. K. H. Peters, 1852) 
 Brycinus intermedius (Boulenger, 1903)
 Brycinus jacksonii (Boulenger, 1912) (Victoria robber)
 Brycinus kingsleyae (Günther, 1896)
 Brycinus lateralis (Boulenger, 1900) (Striped robber)
 Brycinus leuciscus (Günther, 1867)
 Brycinus longipinnis (Günther, 1864) (Long-fin tetra)
 Brycinus luteus (Román, 1966)
 Brycinus macrolepidotus Valenciennes, 1850 (True big-scale tetra)
 Brycinus minutus (A. J. Hopson & J. Hopson, 1982) (Dwarf Lake Turkana robber)
 Brycinus nigricauda (Thys van den Audenaerde, 1974)
 Brycinus nurse (Rüppell, 1832) (Nurse tetra)
 Brycinus opisthotaenia (Boulenger, 1903)
 Brycinus peringueyi (Boulenger, 1923)
 Brycinus poptae (Pellegrin, 1906)
 Brycinus rhodopleura (Boulenger, 1906)
 Brycinus sadleri (Boulenger, 1906) (Sadler's robber)
 Brycinus schoutedeni (Boulenger, 1912)
 Brycinus taeniurus (Günther, 1867)
 Brycinus tessmanni (Pappenheim, 1911)
 Brycinus tholloni (Pellegrin, 1901)

References

 
Fish of Africa
Taxonomy articles created by Polbot